Bob Paulson is a Republican politician who has served North Dakota's 3rd legislative district in the North Dakota Senate since 2022. He previoulsy represented the third district in the North Dakota House of Representatives. Paulson is also a retired navy pilot and rancher.

References

Living people
Republican Party members of the North Dakota House of Representatives
21st-century American politicians
Year of birth missing (living people)
Evangel University alumni
Farmers from North Dakota